Jonathan Edward Favreau (born June 2, 1981) is an American political commentator, podcaster, and the former director of speechwriting for President Barack Obama.

Favreau attended the College of the Holy Cross, where he took part in and/or directed numerous community and civic programs. He also accumulated numerous scholastic honors before graduating as valedictorian. After graduation, he went to work for the John Kerry presidential campaign in 2004, working to collect talk radio news for the campaign and was promoted to the role of Deputy Speechwriter. Favreau first met Barack Obama, then a state senator from Illinois, while working on the Kerry campaign.

In 2005, Obama's communications director Robert Gibbs recommended Favreau to Obama as a speechwriter. Favreau was hired as Obama's speechwriter shortly after Obama's election to the United States Senate. Obama and Favreau grew close, and Obama referred to him as his "mind reader". He went on the campaign trail with Obama during his successful presidential election campaign. In 2009, he was named to the White House staff as Director of Speechwriting.

In January 2017, he co-founded liberal media company Crooked Media with fellow former Obama staffers Tommy Vietor and Jon Lovett, and began co-hosting the political podcast Pod Save America with Vietor, Lovett, and Dan Pfeiffer.

Early life
Favreau was born at Winchester Hospital and raised in nearby North Reading, Massachusetts, the son of Lillian ( DeMarkis), a schoolteacher, and Mark Favreau. His father is of French Canadian descent and his mother is of Greek descent. His grandfather, Robert Favreau, was a member of the New Hampshire House of Representatives and described by Favreau as a "New England Republican." Favreau graduated from the Jesuit College of the Holy Cross in 2003 as his class's valedictorian, with a degree in political science.

At Holy Cross, he was treasurer and debate committee chairman for the College Democrats, and studied classical piano. From 1999 to 2000, he served on the Welfare Solidarity Project, eventually becoming its director. In 2001, Favreau worked with Habitat for Humanity and a University of Massachusetts Amherst program to bring visitors to cancer patients. 

In 2002, he became head of an initiative to help unemployed individuals improve their résumés and interview skills. He also earned a variety of honors in college, including the Vanicelli Award; being named the 2001 Charles A. Dana Scholar; memberships in the Political Science Honor Society, Pi Sigma Alpha, the College Honors Program, the Sociology Honor Society, Alpha Kappa Delta, and was awarded a Harry S. Truman Scholarship in 2002. He was an editor on his college newspaper, and during summers in college, he earned extra income selling newspapers as a telemarketer, while also interning in John Kerry's offices.

Kerry campaign
He joined Senator John Kerry's 2004 presidential campaign soon after graduation from the College of the Holy Cross. While working for the Kerry campaign, his job was to assemble audio clips of talk radio programs for the Kerry camp to review for the next day. When the Kerry campaign began to falter at one point, they found themselves without a speechwriter, and Favreau was promoted to the role of deputy speechwriter. Following Kerry's defeat, Favreau became dispirited with politics, and was uncertain if he would do such work again. Favreau first met Obama (then an Illinois State Senator running for the U.S. Senate), while still working for Kerry, backstage at the 2004 Democratic National Convention as Obama was rehearsing his keynote address. Favreau, then 23 years old, interrupted Obama's rehearsal, advising the soon-to-be-elected Senator that a rewrite was needed because Kerry wanted to use one of the lines.

Obama campaign 

Obama communications aide Robert Gibbs, who had worked for Kerry's campaign, recommended Favreau to Obama as an excellent writer, and in 2005 he began working for Barack Obama in his U.S. Senate office before joining his presidential campaign as chief speechwriter in 2006. His interview with Obama was on the Senator's first day. Uninterested in Favreau's résumé, Obama instead questioned Favreau on what motivated him to work in politics and his theory of writing. He described this theory to Obama as, "A speech can broaden the circle of people who care about this stuff. How do you say to the average person that's been hurting: 'I hear you, I'm there?' Even though you've been so disappointed and cynical about politics in the past, and with good reason, we can move in the right direction. Just give me a chance."

Favreau led a speechwriting team for the campaign that included Ben Rhodes and Cody Keenan. For his work with Obama in the campaign, he would wake as early as 5 a.m., and routinely stayed up until 3 a.m. working on speeches. His leadership style among other Obama speechwriters was very informal. They would often meet in a small conference room, discussing their work late into the evening over takeout food. According to Rhodes, Favreau did not drive structured meetings with agendas. "If he had, we probably would have laughed at him," Rhodes said. Favreau was planning to hire more speechwriters to assist him, but conceded he was unsure of how to manage them. According to him, "My biggest strength isn't the organization thing."

He has likened his position to "Ted Williams' batting coach", because of Obama's celebrated abilities as a speaker and writer. Obama senior adviser David Axelrod said of Favreau, "Barack trusts him... And Barack doesn't trust too many folks with that—the notion of surrendering that much authority over his own words." In Obama's own words, Favreau was his "mind reader". He and Obama share a fierce sports rivalry between the Boston Red Sox, favored by Favreau, and the Chicago White Sox, favored by Obama. When the White Sox defeated the Red Sox 3–0 in the 2005 American League playoffs, Obama swept off Favreau's desk with a small broom. During the campaigns, he was obsessed with election tracking polls, jokingly referring to them as his "daily crack". At points during the campaign, he felt overwhelmed by his responsibilities and would turn to Axelrod and his friends for advice.

Favreau has declared that the speeches of Robert F. Kennedy and Michael Gerson have influenced his work, and has expressed admiration for Peggy Noonan's speechwriting, citing a talk given by Ronald Reagan at Pointe du Hoc as his favorite Noonan speech. Gerson also admires Favreau's work, and sought him out at an Obama New Hampshire campaign rally to speak with the younger speechwriter. Favreau was the primary writer of Obama's inauguration address of January 2009. The Guardian describes the process as follows: 

"The inaugural speech has shuttled between them [Obama and Favreau] four or five times, following an initial hour-long meeting in which the President-elect spoke about his vision for the address, and Favreau took notes on his computer. Favreau then went away and spent weeks on research. His team interviewed historians and speechwriters, studied periods of crisis, and listened to past inaugural orations. When ready, he took up residence in a Starbucks in Washington and wrote the first draft."

White House Director of Speechwriting (2009-2013) 
When President Obama assumed office in 2009, Favreau was appointed Assistant to the President and Director of Speechwriting. He became the second-youngest chief White House speechwriter on record, after James Fallows. His salary was $172,200 a year.

Favreau has said his work with Obama will be his final job in the realm of politics, saying, "Anything else would be anticlimactic." In regard to his post-political future, he said, "Maybe I'll write a screenplay, or maybe a fiction book based loosely on what all of this was like. You had a bunch of kids working on this campaign together, and it was such a mix of the serious and momentous and just the silly ways that we are. For people in my generation, it was an unbelievable way to grow up."

After the White House
In March 2013, Favreau left the White House, along with Tommy Vietor, to pursue a career in private sector consulting and screenwriting. Together, they founded the communications firm Fenway Strategies. From 2013 to 2016, Favreau wrote sporadically for the Daily Beast. In 2016, after the November presidential election was won by Donald Trump, Favreau, Vietor and Jon Lovett founded Crooked Media. Favreau co-hosts Crooked's premier political podcast Pod Save America with Dan Pfeiffer, Vietor and Lovett. In the wake of the new Republican healthcare bill, the AHCA, he coined the term "Wealthcare".

He currently serves on the Board of Advisors of Let America Vote, a voting rights organization founded by fellow Crooked Media host Jason Kander.

Accolades 
Favreau was named one of the "100 Most Influential People in the World" by Time magazine in 2009. In the same year he was ranked 33rd in the GQ "50 Most Powerful in D.C." and featured in the Vanity Fair "Next Establishment" list. Favreau was one of several Obama administration members in the 2009 "World's Most Beautiful People" issue of People magazine. Executive Producer for the podcast This Land, and was nominated for a 2021 Peabody Award.

Controversies 
On December 5, 2008, a picture of Favreau grabbing the breast of a cardboard cut-out of then-Senator Hillary Clinton was posted on Facebook. Clinton had recently been announced as Obama's nominee for U.S. Secretary of State. Favreau called Senator Clinton's staff to offer an apology. The senator's office responded by joking that "Senator Clinton is pleased to learn of Jon's obvious interest in the State Department, and is currently reviewing his application."

In June 2010, the website FamousDC obtained a picture of Favreau along with Assistant White House Press Secretary Tommy Vietor, playing beer pong after taking off their shirts at a restaurant in the Georgetown neighborhood of Washington, D.C. This event attracted criticism from the press because of its timing during the height of the Gulf of Mexico oil spill.

Personal life 
On June 17, 2017, Favreau married Emily Black, daughter of federal Judge Timothy Black, at her family's vacation home in Biddeford Pool, Maine. Their son, Charlie, was born in August 2020. On May 23, 2014, Favreau was awarded an honorary Doctor of Public Service degree by his alma mater, Holy Cross, where he also gave the commencement address. He is the brother of actor Andy Favreau.

References

External links 

 
 Jon Favreau's valedictory address at College of the Holy Cross
 Leaving West Wing to pursue Hollywood dream, Tracy Jan, The Boston Globe, March 3, 2013

1981 births
American people of French-Canadian descent
American people of Greek descent
American podcasters
College of the Holy Cross alumni
Crooked Media
Living people
Massachusetts Democrats
Obama administration personnel
People from North Reading, Massachusetts
People from Winchester, Massachusetts
Speechwriters for presidents of the United States
White House Directors of Speechwriting